Hisah (Hokr el Haïssa, Haysa, Hayssa,  El Haïssa, Hisa) is a northern Lebanese village in Akkar Governorate, close to the Syrian border. It is mostly inhabited by Alawites and  Sunni Muslims.

History
The history of the village goes back to the days of the Banu Hilal tribe, and it is named after the horse of Abu-Zayd al-Hilali.

In the late 1620s or early 1630s, the Druze strongman of and Ottoman governor Fakhr al-Din II planted a large grove of mulberry trees in Hisah, as well as Tripoli, as part of his efforts to stimulate the burgeoning silk industry of Mount Lebanon.

In 1838, Eli Smith noted  the village, whose inhabitants were Alawites, located west of esh-Sheikh Mohammed.

During the 2006 Lebanon War, a bridge in the village was bombed by Israeli planes, leaving up to 12 people dead.

References

Bibliography

External links
 Hayssa, Localiban 

Populated places in Akkar District
Alawite communities in Lebanon
Sunni Muslim communities in Lebanon